Laila Fawzi (1923 - January 12, 2005), also spelt as Leila Fawzi and Layla Fawzy, was an Egyptian actress and model. She was one of the pioneers of Egyptian cinema and starred in over 85 films throughout her career. In 1940, she was crowned Miss Egypt.

Personal life
Fawzi was born in Turkey to Egyptian parents. Her father owned fabric stores in Cairo, Damascus and Istanbul. She won Miss Egypt contest in 1940 and was awarded a small role in the Egyptian movie Wives Factory in 1941.

She married three times; firstly to fellow Egyptian actor Aziz Osman, followed by Anwar Wagdi, and then Galal Moawad.

Death
Fawzi died on January 12, 2005.

References

External links
 

1923 births
2005 deaths
Egyptian actresses
Egyptian television actresses
Egyptian film actresses
Egyptian female models
Egyptian expatriates in Turkey